Stage Struck is a 1948 American crime film directed by William Nigh and starring Kane Richmond, Audrey Long and Conrad Nagel.

Synopsis

Partial cast
 Kane Richmond as Nick Mantee  
 Audrey Long as Nancy Howard  
 Conrad Nagel as Police Lt. Williams  
 Ralph Byrd as Police Sgt. Tom Ramey 
 John Gallaudet as Benny Nordick 
 Anthony Warde as Mr. Barda  
 Pamela Blake as Janet Winters  
 Charles Trowbridge as Police Capt. Webb  
 Nana Bryant as Mrs. Howard  
 Selmer Jackson as Mr. Howard  
 Evelyn Brent as Miss Lloyd 
 Wanda McKay as Helen Howard  
 Lyn Thomas as Ruth Ames  
 Wilbur Mack as Prof. Corella

References

Bibliography
 Stephens, Michael L. Art Directors in Cinema: A Worldwide Biographical Dictionary. McFarland, 1998.

External links
 
 
 
 

1948 films
1948 crime films
1940s English-language films
American crime films
Films directed by William Nigh
Monogram Pictures films
American black-and-white films
1940s American films